Entovalva is a genus of bivalves belonging to the family Lasaeidae.

Species:

Entovalva amboinensis 
Entovalva lessonothuriae 
Entovalva mirabilis 
Entovalva nhatrangensis

References

Lasaeidae
Bivalve genera